State Route 268 is a state highway in the U.S. state of Utah that connects I-15 to US-89 in a span of . The highway is completely within Salt Lake City and is routed along 600 North.

Route description
The highway begins just west of the interchange with I-15 at 800 West. Immediately following that intersection, a short viaduct begins. After the structure tops out, the single-point urban interchange begins at exit 309 on I-15. Past the SPUI, the viaduct crosses over 600 West, 500 West, and the Union Pacific/Utah Transit Authority train tracks. The viaduct structure reaches grade-level at 400 West and continues east for another block before terminating at US-89 (Beck Street).

The portion of the route between I-15 and 400 West is part of the National Highway System.

History
The State Road Commission designated SR-268 in 1960, connecting proposed I-15 to SR-1 (US-89/US-91) along 600 North.

Major intersections

References

268
 268
 268
Streets in Utah